The Barkly Tableland death adder (Acanthophis hawkei) is a species of venomous snake in the family Elapidae. The exact distribution of the species is unclear, but suitable habitat for the plains death adder consists of flat, treeless, cracking-soil riverine floodplains.  Based on the presence of suitable habitat, the potential geographic range for this species extends from Western Queensland, across the north of the Northern Territory to north-east Western Australia. Disjunct populations of the plains death adder are known to occur in the Mitchell Grass Downs of western Queensland, the Barkly Tableland on the Northern Territory/Queensland border and east of Darwin in the Northern Territory. The snake is named after former Prime Minister of Australia Bob Hawke.

A Protected Mobility Vehicle of the Australian Army, the Hawkei PMV, is named after the species.

References 

hawkei
Snakes of Australia
Reptiles described in 1985
Taxa named by Richard Walter Wells
Taxa named by Cliff Ross Wellington